42nd Street Line may refer to:

IRT 42nd Street Shuttle, Manhattan, New York City, United States
The IRT Flushing Line runs partially under 42nd Street in Manhattan
42nd Street Crosstown Line (Manhattan surface), now the M42 bus route